Abdulrazek al-Nadoori is a Libyan military officer. Since 2014 he has been the Chief of the General Staff in Field Marshal Khalifa Haftar's Libyan National Army, loyal to the Tobruk-based House of Representatives. He also served as the military governor of eastern Libya, from Bin Jawad to Derna.

Political role
In late 2016, Abdulrazek al-Nadoori replaced several of the elected municipal mayors in eastern Libya by unelected people, mostly military.

References

Living people
Libyan generals
Year of birth missing (living people)